Adrián Colunga Pérez (born 17 November 1984) is a Spanish former footballer who played as a striker.

He appeared in 152 La Liga matches over seven seasons, scoring a total of 36 goals for Recreativo, Zaragoza, Getafe, Sporting de Gijón and Granada. He added 54 games and 17 goals in the Segunda División, and also competed professionally in England, Cyprus and India.

Club career
Colunga was born in Oviedo, Asturias. After unsuccessfully emerging through Sporting de Gijón's youth system he made his professional debut on loan, in the Segunda División B with Marino de Luanco – also in his native region – going on to serve several others in the third tier and Tercera División while also spending the 2004–05 season for Sporting's reserves.

In January 2006, Colunga was definitely released by Gijón and, after a spell in the fourth division and another in the third, joined UD Las Palmas of the Segunda División. He scored 13 league goals (second-best in the squad) in the 2007–08 campaign for a Canary Islands side that was threatened with relegation until the last month of competition.

Colunga was then bought by Recreativo de Huelva in La Liga, in a four-year contract worth €2.7 million. In his debut for the team, on 31 August 2008, he netted the game's only goal in an away win against Andalusia neighbours Real Betis.

Alternating between starts and games from the bench in his first year, Colunga entered the club's history when he scored a penalty kick in a 4–1 loss at Deportivo de La Coruña on 21 December, his fourth consecutive game achieving the feat. Spanish football pundit Guillem Balagué compared the player, in his weekly report of first division encounters, to Valencia CF's David Villa; despite a first fruitful year individually, Recre ranked last.

On 23 January 2010, after experiencing personal problems in the new season at Recreativo, which included a confrontation with club fans, Colunga was loaned to Real Zaragoza of the top flight until June. He scored on his debut eight days later, a 3–1 away victory over CD Tenerife, and finished the campaign as the team's top scorer in only four months of play, with the Aragonese finally escaping relegation.

On 5 August 2010, Colunga was sold to Getafe CF as Kepa Blanco moved in the opposite direction. He was loaned to Sporting Gijón in January 2012, scoring three times in 13 starts during his short spell but suffering top-division relegation.

Colunga transferred to Brighton & Hove Albion on 25 August 2014 for an undisclosed fee, signing a two-year contract. He scored on his debut the following day, contributing to a 4–2 away defeat of Swindon Town in the second round of the League Cup. He added a further three in the English Championship before the close of the year, with away strikes against Bournemouth (3–2 loss), Norwich City (3–3) and Fulham (2–0).

Following the appointment of Chris Hughton as new manager, Colunga found first-team opportunities difficult and, in the very last day of the 2015 January transfer window, joined Granada CF on a loan deal lasting until the end of the season, with the option of a permanent transfer in June. However, after featuring rarely, he returned to Brighton and eventually had his contract terminated by mutual consent on 7 October.

On 2 September 2017, the 32-year-old Colunga switched to the Indian Super League with FC Goa after stints with RCD Mallorca and Cypriot club Anorthosis Famagusta FC. He made his debut on 16 December, scoring in the last minutes of a 5–1 victory against Delhi Dynamos FC.

Colunga's contract was terminated by mutual agreement on 25 January 2018, after he refused to play second-fiddle to compatriot Coro. Four days later, he announced his retirement.

Career statistics

Club

References

External links

1984 births
Living people
Spanish footballers
Footballers from Oviedo
Association football forwards
La Liga players
Segunda División players
Segunda División B players
Tercera División players
Sporting de Gijón B players
Marino de Luanco footballers
UC Ceares players
UD Las Palmas players
Recreativo de Huelva players
Real Zaragoza players
Getafe CF footballers
Sporting de Gijón players
Granada CF footballers
RCD Mallorca players
English Football League players
Brighton & Hove Albion F.C. players
Cypriot First Division players
Anorthosis Famagusta F.C. players
Indian Super League players
FC Goa players
Spanish expatriate footballers
Expatriate footballers in England
Expatriate footballers in Cyprus
Expatriate footballers in India
Spanish expatriate sportspeople in England
Spanish expatriate sportspeople in Cyprus
Spanish expatriate sportspeople in India